Isaac Breuer (1883–1946) was a rabbi in the German Neo-Orthodoxy movement of his maternal grandfather Samson Raphael Hirsch, and was the first president of Poalei Agudat Yisrael.

Biography 
Isaac Breuer was born in Pápa, Austria-Hungary to Salomon Breuer, and lived most of his years in Frankfurt. His brother was Rabbi Joseph Breuer. He attended Hirsch's Realschule school, and received rabbinical ordination at age 20 from his father's yeshivah. He studied law, jurisprudence, and philosophy at Marburg University, and until 1936 practiced law in Frankfurt.

In 1936 Breuer immigrated to Jerusalem, where he founded Poalei Agudat Yisrael represented it before the Peel and Anglo American Commissions. He married Jenny Eisenmann, a granddaughter of Eliezer Liepman Philip Prins. His five children were Jacob (Bub), a lawyer who played a role in the Eichmann trial (1915–2008), Mordechai (1918–2007), Ursula (1919–2006, married Hermann Merkin), Tzipora (Tzip) Breuer Schneller Meir (1926-2020) and Simeon Breuer (1922–1943). His son-in-law Hermann Merkin helped to establish the Isaac Breuer College of Hebraic Studies (IBC program) at Yeshiva University in his memory.

Breuer died in Jerusalem, Mandatory Palestine in 1946. Michal Lupolianski, the wife of former mayor of Jerusalem Uri Lupolianski, is one of his grandchildren.

Views on Zionism 
Although Hirsch's neo-Orthodoxy movement had defined itself from the start largely as an opposition to the German Reform movement, Isaac Breuer already regarded the Reform movement of his day as essentially the impotent and dying remnant of the Haskalah  . Breuer saw the real enemy of Orthodoxy in  both political Zionism and Religious Zionism, which he considered especially dangerous because it possessed an authentic Jewish instinct and impulse. The goals of the Zionists paralleled the goals of his own Agudah organization in many areas ("reunification of land and nation"), but without the stress which Agudah laid on adherence to halachah and tradition . Indeed, Breuer envisioned a Messianic Torah state in the land of Israel, and could not abide the idea of "reunification of land and nation" coming to pass through the agency of secular Zionist forces in the form of a secular state.

Published works 
 Judenproblem (1918), a polemic against the perceived opponents of Orthodoxy, Zionists and Reform Jews.
 Messiasspuren (1918)
 Concepts of Judaism  Levinger, Jacob S. (ed.)
 Der Neue Kusari (Translated into Hebrew by his son Professor Mordechai Breur as Hakuzari Hachadash
 Moriah
 Nachliel
 Das Judische Nationalheim von Isaac Breuer, (1925) Frankfurt AM,Verlag J kauffmann
 Jerusalem: eine historische Erzählung, a metaphor in novella form of what negative consequences might follow from the agenda of Zionists
 Mein Weg'' (1927)
 Isaac Breuer Werkausgabe, Vol. I, Frühe religionsphilosophische Schriften, Münster-Berlin 2017
 Isaac Breuer Werkausgabe, Vol. II. Schriften zum Zionismus und Agudismus, Münster-Berlin 2018
 Isaac Breuer Werkausgabe, Vol. III. Frühe literarische Texte, Munster-Berlin 2018
 Isaac Breuer Werkausgabe  Vol. IV. Der Neue Kusari. Ein Weg zum Judentum,  LIT, Münster 2020, 486 S.

References

Further reading
.
 David N. Myers. Resisting History: Historicism and Its Discontents in German-Jewish Thought. Jews, Christians, and Muslims from the Ancient to the Modern World Series. Princeton and Oxford: Princeton University Press, 2003
 Alan L. Mittleman, Between Kant and Kabbalah: An Introduction to Isaac Breuer's Philosophy of Judaism (SUNY, 1990)
Alan Mittleman, Two Orthodox Jewish Theories of Rights: Sol Roth and Isaac Breuer - Jewish Political Studies Review Volume 3, Numbers 3-4 (Fall 5752/1991)
  Matthias Morgenstern, From Frankfurt to Jerusalem Isaac Breuer and the History of the Secession Dispute in Modern Jewish Orthodoxy
 Matthias Morgenstern Von Frankfurt nach Jerusalem: Isaac Breuer und die Geschichte des `Austrittsstreits' in der deutsch-jüdischen Orthodoxie Reviewer: Marc B. Shapiro in Journal of Jewish Studies Volume 48, Issue 2, Autumn 1997
  Meir Seidler, "Isaac Breuer's Concept of Law" Jewish Law Association Studies VIII The Jerusalem 1994 Conference Volume
 George Y. Kohler, "Is there a God an sich? Isaac Breuer on Kant’s Noumena", in: AJS Review 36:1 (2012), p. 121-139.

External links 
 Isaac Breuer's political philosophy (English)
 Biography of Isaac Breuer in German
 Breuer on the meaning of the Passover Seder
 Breuer on Yom Kippur
 Eulogy by his granddaughter for his daughter Ursula Merkin- contains comments on Breuer's life
Isaac Breuer College of Hebraic Studies (IBC), Yeshiva University
 Von Jehuda Halevi zu Isaac Breuer

1883 births
1946 deaths
German Orthodox rabbis
Hungarian Orthodox rabbis
Philosophers of Judaism
People from Pápa
Orthodox rabbis in Mandatory Palestine
Burials at the Jewish cemetery on the Mount of Olives
Anti-Zionist Orthodox rabbis